The Anticosti-class minesweepers were a class of minesweepers that served with the Canadian Forces from 1989–2000. The class consisted of two former oil rig supply vessels, Jean Tide and Joyce Tide.  They were acquired by Maritime Command (MARCOM) and commissioned in May 1989 with Jean Tide becoming  and Joyce Tide becoming . Once the s became operational, the Anticosti class was discarded and the two ships returned to mercantile use.

Design
Laid down as Lady Joyce and Lady Jean by Allied Shipbuilders Ltd. of Vancouver, the two ships of the class were initially constructed for use as offshore drill-rig supply vessels by International Offshore Services. Later renamed, they were purchased in 1988 by the Maritime Command of the Canadian Forces and converted into minesweepers. Fully loaded, the ships of the class displaced .

The Anticosti class was powered by four NOHAB Polar SF 16RS diesel engines driving two shafts creating  and one  Gil Jet azimuth bow thruster. The vessels had a complement of 5 officers and 18 ratings. The two ships of the class were equipped two Racal Decca navigation radars operating on the I band. For minesweeping purposes, they were provided with mechanical minesweeping equipment and a high frequency, towed side scan variable depth sonar. The vessels were rated as ice class 3 and suitable for employment in light ice.

Ships

Service history
The two ships were constructed by Allied Shipbuilders Ltd. of Vancouver and named Joyce Tide and Jean Tide. After completion Jean Tide served as an oil rig logistics support vessel for International Offshore Service of Liberia. In 1975 she was sold to Tidewater Marine. Jean Tide remained with this company until her sale in 1988.

As part of the plan for the Naval Reserve to take over minesweeping and coastal operations, MARCOM began its effort to provide ships for training. MARCOM acquired two ships in March 1988. The ships were handed over for conversion by Fenco MacLaren Incorporated (later SNC-Lavalin Defence Programs Inc.) at Halifax, Nova Scotia and commissioned. Anticosti (formerly Jean Tide) was commissioned on 7 May 1989 with hull number MSA 110. Moresby (formerly Joyce Tide) entered service on 1 January 1990 with the hull number MSA 112.

The vessels sailed to Marystown, Newfoundland for conversion. In April 1990 they had their mechanical sweep gear and sonar fitted. Anticosti was assigned to Maritime Forces Atlantic (MARLANT) as a minesweeping training vessel in preparation for the Maritime Coastal Defence Vessel Project (MCDV), which would become the Kingston class in the late 1990s. Anticosti was deployed by MARLANT in the annual MARCOT exercises as a minelayer. In March 1997, Moresby transferred to CFB Esquimalt.

During the investigation into the Swissair Flight 111 crash in September 1998, Anticosti was among the Maritime Command vessels that responded to the crash site. She among the many ships scoured the sea looking for the aircraft's black box as part of Operation "Persistence".

After the Kingston class entered service, the Anticosti class was identified as surplus and Moresby paid off on 10 March 2000. Anticosti paid off on 21 March 2000. They were sold to commercial interests in January 2002.

References

Notes

References

External links
 

 
Mine warfare vessel classes